William Meronek (April 15, 1917 — May 25, 1999), nicknamed "Bill" or "Smiley", was a Canadian professional ice hockey forward who played 20 games in the National Hockey League for the Montreal Canadiens between 1940 and 1943. The rest of his career, which lasted from 1937 to 1950, was spent in various minor leagues. He was born in Stony Mountain, Manitoba.

Career statistics

Regular season and playoffs

Awards and achievements
 MJHL Scoring Champion (1937)
 Honoured Member of the Manitoba Hockey Hall of Fame

External links
 
 William Meronek's biography at Manitoba Hockey Hall of Fame

1917 births
1999 deaths
Canadian ice hockey forwards
Ice hockey people from Manitoba
Montreal Canadiens players
Montreal Royals (QSHL) players
Portage Terriers players
St. Boniface Seals players